The tables below contains data published by the Civil Aeronautics Administration on the busiest airports in Taiwan by total passenger traffic.

In graph

2018 statistics
The 17 airports in Taiwan in 2018 ordered by total passenger traffic, according to statistics of Taiwan Civil Aeronautics Administration.。

2016 statistics
The 17 airports in Taiwan in 2016 ordered by total passenger traffic, according to statistics of Taiwan Civil Aeronautics Administration.。

References 

Taiwan